Pathabhari  is a village development committee in Jhapa District in the Koshi Province of south-eastern Nepal. At the time of the 1991 Nepal census it had a population of 3439 people living in 709 individual households.

References

Populated places in Jhapa District